Masahiro Hara (born 1957) is a Japanese engineer and Hosei University graduate who is best known for inventing the QR code in 1994.

Early life and education 
Hara was born in Tokyo in 1957. He studied in the department of electric and electronic engineering at Hosei University. He graduated in 1980.

Career

Denso and QR code invention 
Hara invented the QR code to track car parts while he was working at the Japanese company Denso Wave, which had a Toyota contract. Hara had been given the task of coming up with a better way of tracking parts used in the automotive industry, and had helped develop a barcode system in the 1980s. One day at work, over a lunchtime game of go, he recognized the game's black and white pattern could be used to encode information. The code was introduced in 1994.

In 2021, QR codes were being used to book and track COVID-19 tests and contact tracing. Hara has stated that he would like to develop QR codes for additional medical purposes, including imaging such as x-rays or electrocardiogram data.  Hara still works for Denso as of 2022.

Japan International Cooperation Agency 
Hara was the chief engineer and advisor for a Japan International Cooperation Agency's "School For All" program to improve education in Niger.

Selected publications 

 Co-author of chapters 7 & 12 of  "Educational development through community-wide collaboration", 2020 book "Community Participation with Schools in Developing Countries" ISBN 9780429057472

Awards
In 2014, he and the inventors of the QR code development team were awarded the European Inventor Award.

References

Further reading
 

Living people
Hosei University alumni
Japanese engineers
Japanese inventors
1957 births